Jégou is a French surname. Notable people with the surname include:

 (born 1934), French painter
Jean-Jacques Jégou (born 1945), French politician
Lilian Jégou (born 1976), French cyclist

Breton-language surnames